Novoselsky is a rural locality (a settlement) in Panfilovskoye Rural Settlement, Novoanninsky District, Volgograd Oblast, Russia. The population was 520 as of 2010. There are 6 streets.

Geography 
Novoselsky is located in forest steppe on the Khopyorsko-Buzulukskaya Plain, 40 km southeast of Novoanninsky (the district's administrative centre) by road. Zaprudny is the nearest rural locality.

References 

Rural localities in Novoanninsky District